Poultry farming in Bangladesh is the process of keeping different types of birds for meat, egg, feather or sale. In Bangladesh, poultry birds are widely used for meat and egg.

Bangladesh weather is very much friendly for poultry farming. There are various kind of poultry birds that have been domesticated for many years. As of 2017 about 300 billion taka has been invested in the poultry industry. There are an estimated 150,000 poultry farms in Bangladesh. From 2 to 4 March 2017, Poultry Science Association Bangladeshi branch held the tenth International Poultry Show and Seminar in Bashundhara Convention centre, Dhaka, Bangladesh. The farms annually produce 570 million tonnes of meat and 7.34 billion eggs. Poultry feed is made mostly from imported soybean and soy meal. Per capita consumption of meat and egg remain below the level recommended by the Food and Agriculture Organization. Avian Influenza has been damaging for the poultry and associated feed industry in Bangladesh. Some The outbreak in 2007 closed two-thirds of all farms in Bangladesh. Notable figures include: Late Syed Hedayetullah, Phanindra Nath Saha who developed poultry sector with Aftab Bahumukhi Farms.

Present condition 
The most widely used poultry for meat are Broilers Chicken and for egg are Layers Chicken.

Domesticated birds
The most widely domesticated birds in Bangladesh are:
 Chicken
 Duck
 Goose
 Muskovy
 Pigeon

Other species
Nowadays some birds are added to Bangladesh poultry and their popularity are growing day by day. They are:
 Quail
 Turkey
 Guinea Fowl
 Ostrich
 Emu

See also 
Agriculture in Bangladesh 
Agriculture

References

 
Agriculture in Bangladesh